Collin James Wiles (born May 30, 1994) is an American professional baseball pitcher in the Milwaukee Brewers organization. He made his MLB debut in 2022 for the Oakland Athletics.

Career
Collin attended Blue Valley West High School in Stillwell, Kansas and was drafted in the first round of the 2012 MLB Draft by the Texas Rangers.  He was called up by the Oakland Athletics on September 11, 2022. He elected free agency on November 10, 2022.

On December 20, 2022, Wiles signed a minor league contract with an invite to spring training with the Milwaukee Brewers.

References

External links

1994 births
Living people
Sportspeople from Overland Park, Kansas
Baseball players from Kansas
Major League Baseball pitchers
Oakland Athletics players
Arizona League Rangers players
Spokane Indians players
Down East Wood Ducks players
Hickory Crawdads players
High Desert Mavericks players
Frisco RoughRiders players
Round Rock Express players
Las Vegas Aviators players